The Foreign Trade Bank of the Democratic People's Republic of Korea (Joson Trade Bank) is North Korea's primary foreign exchange bank, and is owned and run by the North Korean government.

On March 11, 2013, the United States designated the bank as falling under US executive order 13382, which applies to "proliferators of weapons of mass destruction and their supporters". The order freezes all assets, and prohibits any transactions between US entities and the bank.

On May 7, 2013, the state-controlled Bank of China announced that they would stop all dealings with the Foreign Trade Bank. China has in the past been reluctant to sanction North Korea, even though China has been very unsatisfied with North Korea's aggressive stance and pursuit of nuclear weapons. Stopping the dealing with the Foreign Trade Bank is seen as a significant signal by China to put pressure on North Korea.

On August 5, 2017 the UN Security Council adopted Resolution 2371 expanding financial sanctions to include the bank.

After UN Security Council Resolution 2094 was adopted in March 2013, several Chinese banks will not deal with the Foreign Trade Bank.

The United States Department of the Treasury has designated Dandong Zhongsheng Industry & Trade Co Ltd and Korea Ungum Corporation as FTB front companies, and sanctioned the Moscow-based Agrosoyuz Commercial Bank for facilitating transactions for the FTB.

See also

Central Bank of the Democratic People's Republic of Korea
Ministry of External Economic Relations
Economy of North Korea

References

External links
Treasury Sanctions Bank and Official Linked to North Korean Weapons of Mass Destruction Programs - US Department of the Treasury

Banks of North Korea